The twelfth season of Akademi Fantasia, also branded as AF2015, premiered on 3 August 2015 and concluded on 11 October 2015 on the Astro Ria television channel. Zizan Razak and Faizal Ismail continued to host the show once again, while Ramli M.S. returned as a judge and Rozita Che Wan joined the judging panel.

The professional trainers for this season were announced in a press conference for media, which include trainers from previous season, Linda Jasmine, Fatimah Abu Bakar, Acis, Shahrol, Que Haidar & Fauziah Nawi, while Edry Abdul Halim has been announced as the new principal for this season.

On 11 October 2015, Mohammad Sufie Rashid was announced as the season's winner, making the first winner from Singapore, who defeated Syameel Aqmal Mohd Fodzly.

Auditions
Auditions were held in the following cities:
 Bayview Hotel, Penang - 2 & 3 May 2015
 Novotel Hotel, Kota Kinabalu, Sabah - 9 & 10 May 2015
 Berjaya Waterfront, Johor - 23 & 24 May 2015
 National Sports Complex Kuala Lumpur - 30 & 31 May 2015

List of songs during auditions

Songs for female
 "Gilalah" – Stacy
 "Di Pintu Syurga" - Dayang Nurfaizah
 "Sesal Separuh Nyawa" - Alyah
 "Ya Maulai" - Datuk Siti Nurhaliza
 "ChaROssa]]

Songs for male
 "Mewangi" – Akim & The Majistret
 "Matahari" – Hafiz
 "Pencuri" – Mark Adam
 "All of Me" – John Legend
 "Harus Terpisah" – Cakra Khan
 "Umpan Jinak Di Air Tenang" – Ahmad Jais
 "Pelesit Kota" – Search
 "Sedetik Lebih" – Anuar Zain

Contestants were required to be between the ages of 18 to 35, and are Malaysian and Singaporean citizens.

Students
Ages stated are at time of contest.

Concert summaries

Week 1
 Aired date: 9 August 2015
 Guest judges: -  
 
 Best performances: Nurhusnina Haziqah binti Naharuddin (Ziqa) 
 Eliminated: Sharmaine Arissa binti Shahrudin (Arisa), Nurdalila binti Mohamed Yusof (Dalila), Khairul Mohammad Syahid bin Abu Hassan (Syahid) & Wili (Suili George)

Week 2
 Aired date: 16 August 2015
 Theme: Love
 Guest judges: Amy Search 
 
 Best performances: Mohammad Sufie bin Rashid (Sufi) 
 Eliminated: Sharifah Nabilah binti Syed Azhar (Ifa) 
 Guest performances: "Apa Khabar" (Joe Flizzow) & "Not For Sale" (Stacy)

Week 3
 Aired date: 23 August 2015
 Theme: 90s
 Guest judges: Amelina
 
 Best performances: Nurnajmi Nabila binti Samsaidi (Bila) 
 Eliminated: Nurhusnina Haziqah binti Naharuddin (Ziqa)

Week 4
 Aired date: 30 August 2015
 Theme: -
 Guest judges: Adlin Aman Ramlie 
 
 Best performances: Syameel Aqmal bin Mohammad Fodzly (Syamel) 
 Eliminated: No elimination.

Week 5
 Aired date: 6 September 2015 
 Theme: Film's Soundtrack (OST) 
 Guest judges: Afgan 
{| border="8" cellpadding="4" cellspacing="0" style="margin:  1em 1em 1em 0; background: #f9f9f9; border: 1px #aaa  solid; border-collapse: collapse; font-size: 90%;"
|- bgcolor="#f2f2f2" 
!Student
!Song 
!Film
!Result
|-
| Faroq 
| "Bujang Lapok" (P. Ramlee) + "Malam Bulan Di Pagar Bintang" (P. Ramlee)
| Bujang Lapok 
| Safe 
|- 
| Aziah 
| "Teruja" (Ella) + "Generasiku" (OAG)
| Gol & Gincu 
| Eliminated
|-
| Openg 
| "Azura" (Jamal Abdillah) + "Setahun Sudah Berlalu" (Alleycats)
| Azura 
| Safe 
|-
| Rachel 
| "Mamma Mia" (Abba) + "Thank You for The Music" (Abba)
| Mamma Mia
| Safe 
|-
| Sharul 
| "Awas" (KRU) + "Negatif" (KRU)
| Awas
| Safe 
|-
| Lisa 
| "Patah Seribu" (Shila Amzah) + "Aku Datang" (Tomok)
| Istanbul Aku Datang 
| Safe 
|- 
| Syamel 
| "Di Ambang Wati" (Wings) + "Ukiran Jiwa" (Awie) 
| Sembilu 
| Safe 
|-
| Bila 
| "When You Wish Upon a Star" (Linda Ronstadt) + "Reflection" (Lea Salonga) + "Kau Dihatiku (Zainal Abidin)
| Pinocchio + Mulan + Tarzan 
| Safe 
|-
| Iqwan 
| "Ada Apa Dengan Cinta" (Melly Goeslaw & Eric) + "Tentang Seseorang" (Anda)
| Ada Apa Dengan Cinta? 
| Safe 
|-
| Sufi 
| "Salam Terakhir" (Sudirman) + "Idola" (Azlan & The Typewriter)
| Hoore! Hoore! 
| Safe 
|-
|} 
 Best performances: Syameel Aqmal bin Mohammad Fodzly (Syamel) 
 Eliminated: Aziah binti Awang (Aziah) 

Week 6
 Aired date: 13 September 2015 
 Theme: Rock
 Guest judges: Ella & Awie 
  
 Best performances: Ang Hui San (Rachel)
 Eliminated: Anthonasius Jadil (Openg) & Muhammad Amyroulfarouk bin Mohammad Nor (Faroq) 

Week 7
 Aired date: 20 September 2015
 Theme: Icon 
 Guest judges: Dato' AC Mizal 
 
 Best performances: Syameel Aqmal bin Mohammad Fodzly (Syamel) 
 Eliminated: Muhammad Ikhwan Alif bin Salim (Iqwan) 

Week 8
 Aired date: 27 September 2015
 Theme: Media & Viewers Choice 
 Guest judges: Ogy Dato' Ahmad Daud 
Solo 
 

Duet 
 
 Best performances: Sharul & Bila (Duet) 
 Eliminated: Syameel Aqmal bin Mohammad Fodzly (Syamel) 
 AF Immunity: Syameel Aqmal bin Mohammad Fodzly (Syamel) Syamel originally eliminated but later Ramli M.S using a 'veto' immunity to save him from the elimination.''

Week 9 (Semifinal)
 Aired date: 4 October 2015
 Theme: World & Duet 
 Guest judges: Dato' AC Mizal & Ogy Dato' Ahmad Daud 
Solo
 

Duet
 
 Best performances: -
 Eliminated: Allyssa Joanne Anak Jambi (Lisa) & Ang Hui San (Rachel)

Week 10 (Final)
 Aired date: 11 October 2015
 Theme: Cover Song & New Single  
 Guest judges: Ogy Dato' Ahmad & Dato' AC Mizal 
 
 Champion: Mohammad Sufie bin Rashid (Sufi) 
 Runner-up: Syameel Aqmal bin Mohammad Fodzly (Syamel) 
 Third place: Nurajmi Nabila binti Samsaidi (Bila) 
 Fourth place: Muhammad Shahrul Amin bin Kamarozzaman (Sharul)

Elimination chart

Cast members

Hosts
 Zizan Razak - Host of concert Akademi Fantasia
 Faizal Ismail - Host of concert Akademi Fantasia
 Nana Mahazan - Host of Diari Akademi Fantasia

Professional trainers
 Edry Abdul Halim - Principal
 Shahrol - Vocal Presentation
 Linda Jasmine - Choreographer
 Fatimah Abu Bakar - English Language Consultant & Counsellor
 Fauziah Nawi & Que Haidar - Drama & Acting
 Acis - Music Director

Judges
 Dato' Ramli M.S
 Rozita Che Wan

Champion Judges
 Stacy
 Joe Flizzow

Season statistics
 Total number of students: 12
 Oldest student: Suili George, 28 years old
 Youngest students: Walfadhilah Suhaizat & Muhammad Fareezuan Adnan, 19 years old

References

2015 Malaysian television seasons
Akademi Fantasia seasons